The Church of Bible Understanding (first known as the Forever Family) was founded in Allentown, Pennsylvania, in 1971 by Stewart Traill (1936–2018). It is a communal organization, teaching a form of evangelical Christianity.

Beginnings 
In the 1970s, with its headquarters in New York, it developed into a controversial network of churches with 10,000 members and 110 communes at its peak, but only a few hundred members in later years.

Traill underwent a conversion experience in the early 1970s in Allentown, joined a Pentecostal church from which he was expelled, and began teaching Bible and developing a following. He changed the name of the "Forever Family" to the "Church of Bible Understanding" in 1976. Ex-members complained that they worked for very low wages, with all the money going to the church. The group had a communal lifestyle, with Traill maintaining that only he can understand the true meaning of the words of God. Traill encourages his group members to break off contact with their families. Over time, the members decreased in number.
The group has been accused of being a cult, and it has been estimated that Traill became a millionaire from it.  

Rev. Bruce Ritter of Covenant House accused The Church of Bible Understanding of enticing 17 youth out of the shelter with promises of salvation, and a state court enjoined them from housing or transporting youth under age 18 without parental permission.

Business Ventures 
With a carpet-cleaning business, "Christian Brothers Carpet Cleaning", they were the inspiration for Seinfelds "Sunshine Carpet Cleaning Cult". They also started a used-van business as a commercial venture.

The group's only successful venture is Olde Good Things, New York City-based retail stores selling architectural salvage goods and antiques. In 2017, the stores funnelled $6.8 million to the Church of Bible Understanding, according to the nonprofit's tax filing for that year.

Haitian Orphanages  
In November 2013, the Associated Press investigated claims that the church was at fault for running sub-standard housing for orphans in Haiti after the two homes the church runs received a failing grade from the Haitian agency that monitors orphanages. "...Even though they claim in IRS filings to be spending around $2.5 million annually, the home for boys and girls was so dirty and overcrowded during recent inspections that the government said it shouldn't remain open."

On February 14, 2020, one "orphanage", run by the organization in Haiti, burned down, killing 15 children; two burned to death and the others died from smoke inhalation, according to a BBC World News report. The cause was alleged to be candles being lit, the facility's generator being inoperative.

Stewart Traill, the long-time leader of the group, died in 2018.

References

External links
 Mike Montoya's COBU Web Page

Christian new religious movements
Christian organizations established in 1971
Christianity in Pennsylvania
Protestantism in New York (state)
Culture of Allentown, Pennsylvania
Christian denominations in North America
Evangelical denominations in North America
Intentional communities in the United States
1971 establishments in Pennsylvania